Christine Babcock is a two-time all-American collegiate athlete in the United States.

She is an Oiselle professional athlete and is best known for being one of only a few high school athletes to compete in the 2008 US Olympic Trials in Eugene, Oregon and for setting two national high school records at the distances of 1500 and 1600 meters.

Early life and education 
Babcock was born in Laguna Hills, California. Her parents met at a running club and her mother, Kelly Babcock, competed in the 1984 U.S. Olympic Marathon Trials. Christine is the middle of three daughters.

Christine attended Woodbridge High School in Irvine, California. She graduated at the University of Washington in 2013.

Athletic career

High school 
Babcock's first major victory in track and field came by winning the girls' 2006 outdoor 1600 meter CIF California State Meet title in 4:41.29 (with a margin of over 1 second) as a sophomore.

During the following cross country season, she won the CIF Division II State Championships by 13 second with a time of 17:20.  In the spring she won her second straight 1600 meter state title in 4:38.85, a new California Interscholastic Federation Record at the time.

In her senior year, Babcock again won the State cross country Division II title, this time in the fastest time of the meet, 17:04. In 2008 track, she won her third straight CIF state meet by 16 seconds in the 1600 meters, was a national high school record of 4:33.82 until 2014 when Alexa Efraimson ran faster at the Washington State meet. Additionally, she won the Mt. SAC Relays 1500 meter race in 4:16.42, at the time a national record. This allowed her to qualify for the 2008 Olympic Trials. Her record would later be broken by Jordan Hasay at the 2008 US Olympic trials in a time of 4:14.50.

College 
In the 2008 cross country season, Babcock led the University of Washington to the program's first NCAA championship. She was the first finisher for the Huskies, at seventh place overall, with a time of 20:02. In track, she set a personal best time of 4:15.10 in the 1500 meters at the NCAA National Championship preliminaries.  She later went on to finish 11th in the finals.

2009 led to another All-American performance in cross country, with Babcock finishing 34th nationally. Her team finished 3rd nationally.  She also placed fifth in the Pac-10 Conference championships.

In January 2010 Babcock stopped running due to an injury in her right foot. Her athletic hiatus lasted seven months. She then missed the 2011 season due to an Achilles tendon injury.

On November 30, 2011, she was named the "Pac-12 Scholar Athlete Of The Year" with a 3.93 grade point average.

Professional 
Beginning in 2013, Babcock was sponsored by Oiselle and trained under coach Lauren Fleshman in Bend, Oregon. She is now retired from professional running and is working in the medical field.

2015 Boulder USA Cross Country Championships Christine Babcock placed 13th.

Personal life 
Babcock is a Christian.

Performance at select events

Personal bests

References

Living people
American female middle-distance runners
Track and field athletes from California
Sportspeople from Orange County, California
People from Laguna Hills, California
Year of birth missing (living people)
21st-century American women